Birgitte Hjort Sørensen (born 16 January 1982) is a Danish actress. She has been nominated for three Robert Awards and one Bodil Award. Born in Hillerød and raised in Birkerød, Sørensen aspired to an acting career after watching the West End production of the musical Chicago while at school. She graduated from the Danish National School of Performing Arts. Her acting debut was in a minor role in the television series The Eagle in 2005. She followed this by playing Roxie Hart in a Copenhagen production of Chicago, and later on the West End. Sørensen's breakthrough role was as journalist Katrine Fønsmark in the television political drama  Borgen (2010–2013, 2022).

Early life
Sørensen was born in Hillerød on 16 January 1982. She grew up in Birkerød. Both her parents are doctors and she has two elder sisters. Her early education was at the Bistrup School in Birkerød and Øregård Gymnasium in Hellerup. At the latter, she was the student council chairman and editor of the school magazine. Sørensen decided in her early teens not to follow her parents' footsteps in pursuing a career in medicine after work experience with her mother at a geriatrics ward. She stated, 'Being met with that number of people who can no longer go to the bathroom or eat by themselves, it was traumatising. I lived too much with their misery.'

While on a school trip to London at the age of 19, she watched the West End production of the musical Chicago which motivated her to become an actress. Sørensen spoke of the experience in an interview for The Guardian, "It was so amazing and sexy, and I sat there thinking, 'I want to be on that stage one day.'". Her motivation was solidified by her participation in a mini-musical school organised by the Gladsaxe Theatre which provided a six month introduction to musical theatre. She continued her studies at the Danish National School of Performing Arts, during which time Sørensen made her acting debut in 2005 as a receptionist on the television series The Eagle. The school forbid its students from having jobs so Sørensen feigned illness to appear on the television show. Two years later she played the lead role of Roxie Hart in the 2007 production of Chicago at the Det Ny Teater in Copenhagen. The musical was critically acclaimed and became the highest grossing Danish theatre production of the year. For her performance she received a Reumert prize. Sørensen then reprised the role in the West End production in 2008 at the Cambridge Theatre.

Career
In 2010, she made her breakthrough by playing the idealistic journalist, Katrine Fønsmark, in the DR fictional political drama Borgen which charted the rise of Denmark's first female prime minister. In order to prepare for the role, she spent a summer training with television news teams and reporters. Sørensen received critical acclaim for playing a strong female protagonist on the show, and international recognition especially in the United Kingdom. For the show's third season, Sørensen received a nomination for the Robert Award for Best Actress in a Leading Role (Television). She also garnered her first nomination for the Robert Award for Best Actress in a Leading Role for playing a criminal psychologist's secretary in the action film Ved verdens ende (2009) with Nikolaj Lie Kaas, and Nikolaj Coster-Waldau. In 2012, Sørensen portrayed painter Marie Krøyer in the biographical film The Passion of Marie which earned her second Best Actress nomination at the Robert Awards. The following year, she appeared as Virgilia in the play Coriolanus with Tom Hiddleston at Donmar Warehouse, London.

In 2015, Sørensen appeared in the "Hardhome" episode of the HBO fantasy drama series Game of Thrones playing Karsi, a wildling chieftain. In the same year, she starred with Anna Kendrick in the musical comedy sequel Pitch Perfect 2 as Kommissar, the leader of a rival German a cappella group. She was also nominated for the Bodil Award for Best Supporting Actress for her performance in Someone You Love, in which she played a mother suffering with drug addiction.

Sørensen played Andy Warhol's muse Ingrid in Martin Scorsese's HBO television series, Vinyl (2016). In the latter part of the same year, she made her Broadway debut in the play Les Liaisons Dangereuses.

She reprised her role as Katrine Fønsmark in Borgen in 2022 when the show returned for a fourth season on Netflix.

Personal life
She is in a relationship with television writer and producer Kristian Ladegaard Pedersen and they have two daughters.

Filmography

Film

Television

Stage

References

External links

Danish film actresses
Danish television actresses
1982 births
Living people
21st-century Danish actresses
People from Hillerød Municipality